Penpattanam is a 2010 Malayalam film by V. M. Vinu. This films takes a look at the struggle for survival of four women who are Kudumbasree workers portrayed by Revathi, KPAC Lalitha, Shwetha Menon and Vishnupriya. This film is based on  2008 Korean film Girl Scout.

Plot
Girija  is a widow with two school-age girls. Suhara  has her husband  bed-ridden after an accident and his operation requires a huge amount. Santha aka Santhedatthi  has to work even in her old age to support her drunkard son and family. Raji lost her parents and lives at the mercy of her sister and sister's husband. Raji is in love with Mani  who is now a plumber but was connected to the underworld before. Raji's brother-in-law is a policeman opposed to her relationship with Mani. The four make a living as city cleaners with Kudumbasree in Kozhikode Corporation. Girija and Santhedatthi take money from the money lender Unnithan Muthalali.

One day, the four find 3,000,000 rupees left in a waste bin. Initially, they went to hand over the money to police but later decided against it, due to their necessity for money, and gave it to Unnithan Muthalali who agrees to pay them a good rate of interest every month. Meanwhile, police find a corpse in the city and find out that the person who was murdered was a hawala (black money) agent. Police, led by Circle Inspector Ayyappadaas, start investigating the missing money and the clues lead to the four women. Meanwhile, Raji becomes engaged to Mani. The four are interrogated by the police. They deny any involvement and are remanded and sent to sub-jail where Raji is attacked by three women with immoral intentions. Suhara fights them all and saves Raji. They are released on bail with the help of Adv. Maheswari Iyer. Later, Girija asks for the return of the money from Unnithan, who initially refuses and asks Girija to share his bed for the money. Girija informs the others and they together fight Unnithan and trick him to retrieve the money.

Finally, they receive news that a charity will sponsor the operation for Suhara's husband. They hand over the money to the widow of the hawala agent who was murdered. Inspector Ayyappadaas understands the whole story but finally lets all four go free, since they did not take the money for themselves but handed it over to the ones who really deserve it.

Cast

Production 
Actress Shwetha Menon was injured on 20 May 2010 while shooting for Penpattanam at Kozhikode. She was injured on her right arm, hacked accidentally in a scene. Following this injury which resulted in a nerve being cut off, the actress underwent minor surgery.

References

External links 

 
 https://web.archive.org/web/20120606143956/http://popcorn.oneindia.in/title/9186/penpattanam.html

2010 films
2010s Malayalam-language films
Films shot in Kozhikode
Films directed by V. M. Vinu